Manzalele is a village in Kwilu province, the Democratic Republic of the Congo. It contains the Manzalele Airport.

Populated places in Kwilu Province